Douglas Evans is an author of children's books and a former school teacher in Berkeley, California.  He has written books, plays, songs, and poems for children, including Classroom at the End of the Hall which got a starred review in Publishers Weekly. and received record reprint rights for a first time author.  The Elevator Family  (2003) was included on the Mass. Book Award Master List and was a 2003 Sunshine Award Nominee.  MVP: Magellan Voyage Project was the 2009 Connecticut Nutmeg Award Winner and 2008 Rebecca Caudill Award Nominee. His lipogram novel Noe School contains not a single E.
1996 Publishers Weekly Flying Start Author:

Career
Evans adapted his book, The Elevator Family, for the stage. It was first produced by Columbus Children's Theater February 2011 and directed by William Goldsmith to critical acclaim.

In addition to the music for his musical, The Elevator Family, Evans has composed several albums for children, including Classroom Creatures (2012), Math Rashes and other Classroom Itches (2013), Teacher (2014), and Extra Credit (2016).

Awards and honors
 2003 Sunshine State Young Readers Award nominee
 2003 Connecticut Nutmeg Book Award nominee 
 2003 Massachusetts Children's Book Master List 
 2003 Garden State Children's Book Awards nominee
 2004 South Dakota Prairie Bud Award nominee
 2004 Virginia State Young Reader's Award nominee
 2008 Rebecca Caudill Award nominee 
 2009 Connecticut Nutmeg Award Winner

Selected bibliography

References

YouTube Channel

1953 births
Living people
American children's writers
American male songwriters
Writers from Ohio
People from Euclid, Ohio
People from Edina, Minnesota
Writers from Berkeley, California
21st-century American writers
University of Oregon alumni
Oregon State University alumni
Songwriters from Ohio
Songwriters from Minnesota
20th-century American dramatists and playwrights
20th-century American male writers
Educators from Ohio
Educators from Minnesota